Fetisov Arena is an indoor arena located in Vladivostok, Russia.  Completed in 2013, it has a seating capacity of 5,500 spectators for hockey matches and up to 7,000 for concerts. The venue is home of Admiral Vladivostok of the Kontinental Hockey League.

The arena is named in honor of Viacheslav Fetisov.

References

Admiral Vladivostok
Indoor arenas in Russia
Music venues in Russia
Indoor ice hockey venues in Russia
Buildings and structures in Vladivostok
Kontinental Hockey League venues
Sport in Vladivostok